Fastnachtspiel (plural fastnachtspiele, English "shrovetide play") was a type of play performed on Shrove Tuesday or fastnacht during the sixteenth century during pre-lenten carnivals. Extant examples mostly originated from the city of Nuremberg (although they were performed widely) and Hans Sachs was considered the most prolific in this form. Though sometimes performed on stage, fastnachtspiele were most often performed on the street or town square as a part of the carnival celebration. Productions usually lacked props and only had simply scenery. Fastnachtspiele typically used preexisting stories from ancient or medieval works which were adapted to contemporary conditions. Playwrights like Sachs took major inspiration from the Decameron and earlier burlesque stories.

List of Works 
Hans Sachs:
 Der fahrende Schüler im Paradies (1550)
 Das Wildbad (1550) 
 Das heiss Eisen (1551) 
 Der Bauer im Fegefeuer (1552)

References

Literature of the German Renaissance
German plays
German literature
Performance art